Kwazulusaurus is an extinct genus of dicynodont therapsid from the Late Permian of South Africa. The type species K. shakai was described from the Dicynodon Assemblage Zone of the Beaufort Group in 2002. It has many similarities with the well-known dicynodont Lystrosaurus, and has been placed in the same family, Lystrosauridae. Kwazulusaurus appears to be transitional between early dicynodonts and the more derived Lystrosaurus; it has the wide skull roof of earlier dicynodonts, and a shortened snout like that of Lystrosaurus.

References

Dicynodonts
Lopingian synapsids of Africa
Fossil taxa described in 2002
Lopingian genus first appearances
Lopingian genus extinctions
Anomodont genera